The 1992 NCAA Division I men's basketball tournament involved 64 schools playing in single-elimination play to determine the national champion of men's  NCAA Division I college basketball. It began on March 19, 1992, and ended with the championship game on April 6 in Minneapolis. A total of 63 games were played.

Duke, coached by Mike Krzyzewski, defeated the Michigan Wolverines, coached by Steve Fisher, 71–51 to claim their second consecutive national championship. Bobby Hurley of Duke was named the tournament's Most Outstanding Player. Michigan subsequently vacated its final two tournament games as part of the University of Michigan basketball scandal.

This tournament is best remembered for the East regional final pitting Duke and Kentucky at The Spectrum in Philadelphia. With 2.1 seconds remaining in overtime, Duke trailed 103–102. Grant Hill threw a pass the length of the court to Christian Laettner, who dribbled once, turned, and hit a jumper as time expired for the 104–103 win. Sports Illustrated deemed it the greatest college basketball game of all time, and ESPN ranked it No. 17 among the top 100 sports moments of the past 25 years (see ESPN25). In 2002, USA Today ranked it the greatest NCAA tournament game of all time. 

The tournament also saw dark horse Cincinnati crash the Final Four and return to national prominence.

Schedule and venues

The following are the sites that were selected to host each round of the 1992 tournament:

First and Second Rounds
March 19 and 21
East Region
 Greensboro Coliseum, Greensboro, North Carolina (Host: Atlantic Coast Conference)
Midwest Region
 Bradley Center, Milwaukee, Wisconsin (Hosts: Marquette University, Great Midwest Conference)
Southeast Region
 Riverfront Coliseum, Cincinnati, Ohio (Hosts: University of Cincinnati, Xavier University)
West Region
 BSU Pavilion, Boise, Idaho (Host: Boise State University)
March 20 and 22
East Region
 Centrum in Worcester, Worcester, Massachusetts (Host: College of the Holy Cross)
Midwest Region
 University of Dayton Arena, Dayton, Ohio (Host: University of Dayton)
Southeast Region
 Omni Coliseum, Atlanta, Georgia (Host: Georgia Institute of Technology)
West Region
 ASU Activity Center, Tempe, Arizona (Host: Arizona State University)

Regional semifinals and finals (Sweet Sixteen and Elite Eight)
March 26 and 28
East Regional, Spectrum, Philadelphia, Pennsylvania (Hosts: Temple University, Villanova University)
West Regional, University Arena ("The Pit"), Albuquerque, New Mexico (Host: University of New Mexico)
March 27 and 29
Midwest Regional, Kemper Arena, Kansas City, Missouri (Host: Big 8 Conference)
Southeast Regional, Rupp Arena, Lexington, Kentucky (Host: University of Kentucky)

National semifinals and championship (Final Four and championship)
April 4 and 6
Hubert H. Humphrey Metrodome, Minneapolis, Minnesota (Host: University of Minnesota)

For the first time since 1951, Minneapolis was the site of the Final Four, held at the Metrodome, the 28th venue used for the Final Four. Once again, all four arenas used for the regional rounds were former Final Four sites. For the first time, the tournament held games in Massachusetts, at the Centrum in Worcester. Additionally, the tournament came to the Bradley Center in Milwaukee, which replaced the MECCA Arena. This tournament would mark the final appearances of Atlanta's Omni Coliseum and the Spectrum in Philadelphia; both have since been replaced. To date, this was the most recent game played in Cincinnati. Any future tournament games to be held in Milwaukee would be played at the Fiserv Forum; if in Minneapolis, Target Center, U.S. Bank Stadium (which hosted 2019 Final 4) or the Xcel Energy Center (which is located in St. Paul).

Teams

Bracket
* – Denotes overtime period

East Regional – Philadelphia, Pennsylvania

West Regional – Albuquerque, New Mexico

Southeast Regional – Lexington, Kentucky

Midwest Regional – Kansas City, Missouri

Final Four – Minneapolis, Minnesota

# signifies Michigan's final two games, in the 1992 Final Four, were vacated on November 7, 2002, as part of the settlement of the University of Michigan basketball scandal.  Unlike forfeiture, a vacated game does not result in the other school being credited with a win, only with the removal of any Michigan wins from all records.

Announcers
Jim Nantz and Billy Packer – Southeast Regional at Lexington, Kentucky; Final Four at Minneapolis, Minnesota
Dick Stockton and Al McGuire/Greg Kelser (afternoon session of first round only) – First & Second Round at Milwaukee, Wisconsin; Midwest Regional at Kansas City, Missouri
Verne Lundquist and Len Elmore – First & Second Round at Cincinnati; East Regional at Philadelphia, Pennsylvania
Greg Gumbel and Quinn Buckner – First & Second Round at Atlanta, Georgia; West Regional at Albuquerque, New Mexico
James Brown and Bill Raftery – First & Second Round at Worcester, Massachusetts
Tim Ryan and Digger Phelps – First & Second Round at Dayton, Ohio
Sean McDonough and Bill Walton – First & Second Round at Boise, Idaho
Brad Nessler and Ann Meyers – First & Second Round at Tempe, Arizona
Mel Proctor and Dan Bonner – First & Second Round at Greensboro, North Carolina

See also
 1992 NCAA Division II men's basketball tournament
 1992 NCAA Division III men's basketball tournament
 1992 NCAA Division I women's basketball tournament
 1992 NCAA Division II women's basketball tournament
 1992 NCAA Division III women's basketball tournament
 1992 National Invitation Tournament
 1992 National Women's Invitation Tournament
 1992 NAIA Division I men's basketball tournament
 1992 NAIA Division II men's basketball tournament
 1992 NAIA Division I women's basketball tournament
 1992 NAIA Division II women's basketball tournament

References

NCAA Division I men's basketball tournament
Ncaa
NCAA Men's Division I Basketball Championship
NCAA Division I men's basketball tournament
NCAA Division I men's basketball tournament